Waring School is a co-educational private school in Beverly, Massachusetts, United States, for students in grades 6–12. The school offers studies in Humanities; extensive music, art, and theatre options, mathematics and science courses, as well as a curriculum of French language and cultural exchange.

History

Waring was founded by Philip and Josée Waring in 1972, and was based in their home in Rockport, Massachusetts, with four students attending. It was originally known as La Petite École. As it expanded, the school purchased the Edith Miles Coolidge Estate in Beverly, Massachusetts, and moved there in 1976. At this time, it changed its name to École Bilingue de Beverly, though it was referred to as the Waring School unofficially. Waring has been based in Beverly ever since, and it has since expanded, in terms of students (from 18 in 1976 to 165 in 2018) and new buildings being constructed, including a theater, gym, and new science labs. The school recently completed a new passive house school building in 2021.

Waring also runs a FIRST Robotics Program, notable for winning the top award at the Massachusetts State FTC Championship in 2022 and having been invited to the FIRST Championship three times, once in 2022, and previously in 2020 and 2019 for winning the FLL State Championship.

Heads of School
 Philip Waring (1972–1991)
 Peter Smick (1991–2012)
 Mel Brown (2012-2015)
 Tim Bakland (2015–Present)

Waring Works

Waring Works is a long-established summer camp that takes place at Waring over the summer and usually in the month of July. The camp offers a selection of Majors and Electives that campers get to pick out for themselves. These include Video, Theater, Visual Arts, Science Exploration, Chess, Strategy Games, Improv, and Photography.

References

1972 establishments in Massachusetts
Educational institutions established in 1972
Private high schools in Massachusetts
Private middle schools in Massachusetts
Private preparatory schools in Massachusetts
Schools in Beverly, Massachusetts